Moscatelli is an Italian surname. Notable people with the surname include:

Edoardo Moscatelli (1898–unknown), Italian sailor
Riccardo Moscatelli (1971–1999), Italian race car driver
Roberto Moscatelli (1895–unknown), Italian sailor
Stefano Moscatelli (died 1485), Italian Roman Catholic prelate, Bishop of Nusco

Italian-language surnames